Spirit Within is an album by trumpeter Red Rodney and multi-instrumentalist Ira Sullivan which was recorded and released on the Elektra/Musician label in 1982.

Reception

The AllMusic review by Scott Yanow stated "By the time of their fifth record, the Red Rodney-Ira Sullivan Quintet also included pianist Garry Dial, bassist Jay Anderson and drummer Steve Bagby, and it was a perfect vehicle for the co-leaders. Rodney was challenged by the advanced material, and underground legend Sullivan received more exposure than he had ever had in his career. On this LP, Sullivan inspired Rodney to some of his finest playing. Superior post-bop music".

Track listing
All compositions by Garry Dial except where noted.
 "Sophisticated Yenta" – 5:55
 "King of France" – 5:21
 "Spirit Within" – 7:46
 "Island Song" – 6:05
 "Monday's Dance" (Ira Sullivan) – 5:48
 "Crescent City" (Jeff Meyer) – 6:35

Personnel
Red Rodney – trumpet, flugelhorn
Ira Sullivan - flute, soprano saxophone, flugelhorn, percussion
Garry Dial – piano
Jay Anderson – bass
Steve Bagby – drums, percussion

References

Elektra/Musician albums
Red Rodney albums
Ira Sullivan albums
1982 albums
Albums produced by Mike Berniker